John Edwin Wedgwood (1916-1992) was an Australian World War II air-officer and rugby league player who played in the 1930s and 1940s. He was a state representative fullback who won the 1941 premiership with the St George Dragons.

Background
Wedgwood was born in Barmedman, New South Wales.

Playing career and War service
Wedgwood played three first grade seasons with St George between 1939 and 1941. He won a premiership with the Dragons when he played fullback in their 1941 Grand Final victory over Eastern Suburbs. 

He represented New South Wales in 1940 and again in 1946 while playing at Dorrigo, New South Wales. 

Wedgwood's career was curtailed by World War II, seeing active service as a warrant officer in 12 squadron in the RAAF between 1941 and 1946.

Wedgwood died at Redhead, New South Wales on 23 December 1992 aged 76.

Published sources
 Whiticker, Alan & Hudson, Glen (2006) The Encyclopedia of Rugby League Players, Gavin Allen Publishing, Sydney
 Haddan, Steve (2007) The Finals - 100 Years of National Rugby League Finals, Steve Haddan Publishing, Brisbane

References

St. George Dragons players
New South Wales rugby league team players
Australian rugby league players
1916 births
1992 deaths
Royal Australian Air Force personnel of World War II
Rugby league fullbacks